Kiku may refer to:

 Kiku, Estonia
 Kikuh, Mazandaran
 Imperial Seal of Japan (Kiku No Gomon) 
 Chrysanthemum Day (Kiku no sekku) 
 Kiku Amino (1912-1978), Japanese author and translator
 Kiku Nishizaki (1900-1979), one of the two pioneer Japanese women aviators
 Kiku Sharda (born 1975), Indian comedian
 Kiku Usami, a Japanese supercentenarian
 Kiku, a Little Bill character
 Ju Jingyi (born 1994), Chinese singer, actress and member of SNH48, nicknamed "Kiku"
 Kīkū, a 6-string guitar-ukulele hybrid, also called a guitalele
KIKU, a television station in Honolulu, Hawaii

Japanese feminine given names